Louis Jeanottelle Sacriste (June 15, 1843 – August 18, 1904) was a First Lieutenant (also Brevet Major) in the United States Army who was awarded the Medal of Honor for gallantry during the American Civil War. He was issued the medal on January 31, 1889 for actions he performed in the battles of Chancellorsville and Auburn in 1863.

Personal life 

Sacriste was born on June 15, 1843 in Wilmington, Delaware. He died on August 18, 1904 in La Grange, Illinois and was buried in Mount Carmel Catholic Cemetery in Hillside, Illinois. He is known to have fathered three children.

Military service 
Sacriste enlisted in the Army on January 9, 1863 in Philadelphia, Pennsylvania, as a Second Lieutenant. On September 1, 1862, he was assigned to Company F of the 116th Pennsylvania Infantry. On March 1, 1863, he was promoted to First Lieutenant and transferred to Company D of the 116th. He was subsequently promoted to Adjutant on November 21, 1863, but was subsequently wounded at the Battle of Cold Harbor on June 3, 1864. Afterwards, on September 22, 1864, he was promoted to Captain, and then to Brevet Major on March 13, 1865.

On May 3, 1863, while still a First Lieutenant, Sacriste saved from capture a gun of the 5th Maine Battery. Later, on October 14, 1863, he saved from destruction the line of the 1st Division, Second Army Corps.

Sacriste later described these actions in writing:

Second action:

Sacriste was mustered out of service on March 6, 1865 in Alexandria, Virginia and was awarded the Medal of Honor, accredited to Nebraska, on January 31, 1889. His Medal of Honor citation reads:

References 

United States Army Medal of Honor recipients
American Civil War recipients of the Medal of Honor

1843 births
1904 deaths